The Birmingham Squadron are an American professional basketball team of the NBA G League based in Birmingham, Alabama, and are affiliated with the New Orleans Pelicans. The team plays their home games at Legacy Arena. The team began play in 2019 in Erie, Pennsylvania, as the Erie BayHawks with home games at the Erie Insurance Arena, while the New Orleans Pelicans were planning to relocate their G League franchise to Birmingham to play at the renovated Legacy Arena beginning with the 2021–22 season. This was the third incarnation of the BayHawks team with the same name, which had been playing in the city continuously since 2008.

History
On March 30, 2017, the New Orleans Pelicans announced their intentions to have an owned-and-operated development team by the 2018–19 season located in the Gulf South region. The organization then announced they were looking at 11 different locations: Mobile in Alabama; Alexandria, Baton Rouge, Lafayette, Lake Charles, Monroe, Shreveport, St. Tammany Parish in Louisiana; Gulfport-Biloxi and Jackson in Mississippi; and Pensacola, Florida. The list was narrowed when the Pelicans' received six proposals their April 25 deadline: Baton Rouge, Jackson, Mobile, Pensacola, Shreveport, and St. Tammany Parish. By August 2017, the only two cities still in contention were Pensacola and Shreveport. On September 12, the city council in Shreveport unanimously voted against building a new arena for the G League. By March 7, 2018, the Pelicans' general manager Dell Demps stated they had put their efforts in creating a  G League team on hold after Pensacola was the only remaining candidate from the submissions. The possibility of expansion was further complicated by the death of Pelicans' owner Tom Benson on March 15.

On October 24, 2018, the Pelicans announced plans to place their G League team in Birmingham, Alabama, by 2022 and play at Legacy Arena located in the Birmingham–Jefferson Convention Complex. As the arena needs to be renovated, the Pelicans' affiliate began play for the 2019–20 season as the Erie BayHawks after the Atlanta Hawks' affiliate, which had previously been playing as the BayHawks, was relocated to College Park, Georgia. On December 9, 2020, the New Orleans Pelicans announced a name-the-team contest. In March 2021, the Pelicans hired David Lane as the team's general manager with the intent on relocating the team in time for the 2021–22 season.

On April 8, 2021, Erie Basketball Management, LLC, the local management company that has operated all three franchises as the Erie BayHawks teams, announced that the organization was unable to find another NBA partner team for 2021–22 and ceased operations. On July 26, 2021, the Birmingham Squadron name, logo, and colors were revealed, with the name "Squadron" being chosen as both a reference to a collective noun used for a group of pelicans and to Alabama's history in military aviation such as the Tuskegee Airmen of the 99th Pursuit Squadron.

Season by season

Head coaches

Current roster

See also
Erie BayHawks (2008–2017) 
Erie BayHawks (2017–2019)

References

External links
 Birmingham Squadron website

 
Basketball teams established in 2018
2018 establishments in Alabama